Introduction  to the Songs of Experience is a poem written by the English poet William Blake.  It was etched and published as part of his collection Songs of Innocence and of Experience in 1794.

Context and interpretation
The poem is etched on a single plate and placed immediately after the title-page of the Songs of Experience. The text has not been found in any draft or manuscript version. Its subject is closely connected with the poem The Voice of the Ancient Bard in the Songs of Innocence. "The Voice of the Ancient Bard" immediately precedes the Introduction to "Songs of Experience" in some copies of the Songs, and Earth's Answer follows in all copies. In the poem, Blake's narratorial voice acts as the Ancient Bard and the Prophet, who hears Jehovah speaking to Adam in the Garden of Eden.

Geoffrey Keynes says that Blake, as the prophet "calls the Fallen Man to regain control of the world, lost when he adopted Reason (the 'starry pole') in place of Imagination.” Earth symbolizes the Fallen Man within the poem. Blake ('the voice of the Bard') calls him to awake from the evil darkness and return to the realm of Imagination, reassuming the light of its previous 'prelapsarian' state. Reason (the 'starry pole') and the Sea of Time and Spece (the 'watr'ry shore') "are there only till the break of day if Earth would consent to leave 'the slumberous mass'".

The illustration shows a big cloud in a night sky and scattered stars. The text is placed on the cloud. There is a nude female with long hair and a halo above her head, reclining on a couch on a cloud below the text. This is probably the image of Earth addressed by "the voice of the Bard".

Coleridge marked the poem with the symbol “H” that meant “still greater” than just “gave me pleasure”. Anonymous Blake's contemporary reviewer (C. A. Tulk? 1830) wrote:

Robert F. Gleckner in his review (1957) notices that Blake hints at the correct reading by means of the ambiguity of the first two stanzas, introducing actually two voices in the poem, the Bard's and the Holy Word's, “calling the lapsed Soul” (line 6).

This dual purpose of the poem is to introduce to the state and the songs of experience, “in which the Holy Word of Jehovah is hypocritical, selfish, and jealous, thinking and acting in terms of the physical phenomena of day and night and the earthly morality of rewarding and punishment”, and the same time the Bard being mortal is prophetically imaginative, who “thinks and acts by eternal time and according to eternal values.”

Kathleen Raine in her Blake's Debt to Antiquity (1963) speaks about Blake's idea that “souls who enter the created world from beyond the galaxy become subject to the demiurge”.  She says that “Blake reminds the fallen soul that she herself comes from eternity, and ‘might control / The starry pole / And fallen, fallen light renew.’ But in this world she is subject to ‘Starry Jealousy’, who, like the Hermetic demiurge, ‘containing the Circles and Whirling them about, turned round as a Wheel his own Workmanships, and suffered them to be turned from an indefinite Beginning to an undeterminable End’.” Here Raine cited the Divine Poemander attributed to Hermes Trismegistus in the Corpus Hermeticum that looks like a quotation from Blake himself.

Musical settings
 Jean Coulthard  (1908–2000): First Song of Experience, for alto voice and piano, 1968.
 John Edmunds  (1913–1986): Hear the voice of bard, for high voice and piano, 1938 (in Hesperides: 50 songs by John Edmunds)
 David Farquhar (1928–2007): Hear the voice of bard, No. 10 from Blake Songs, for voice and piano, 1947-49
 Hayg Boyadjian (b. 1938): Hear the voice of bard. No. 3 from Song Cycle on Poems of William Blake, for soprano, flute, clarinet, percussion, piano, violin, cello, and bass, 1978 
 John Harbison (b. 1938): Introduction (Hear the voice of bard), No. 1 from Five Songs of Experience, for 4 soli, SATB chorus, string quartet and percussions, 1971
 Gary Higginson (b. 1952): Introduction (Hear the voice of bard), No. 1 from Seven Songs of Experience (set no. 2), for SATB, 1981-2
 David Haines (b.1956): Introduction (Hear the voice of bard), No. 1 from Songs of Experience, for high voice and piano, 1972–79, rev. 1984
 U2: Beautiful Ghost, from The Joshua Tree, Deluxe Edition, 2007 20th anniversary re-issue
The Joshua Tree#20th anniversary remastered edition
The list also includes works by: Joseph Charles Holbrooke, UK; Daniel Jenkyn Jones, UK; Kelsey Jones, Canada; Sharon E. Kanach, USA; Joan Anne Littlejohn, UK; Otto Luening, USA; David Lumsdaine, Australia/UK; Frank Mitchell (John Franklin Mitchell), USA; Gordon Myers, USA, Sarah l. Rogers, UK, Sven-David Sandström, Sweden; Paul Schwartz (1907–1999), USA/Austria; Elie Siegmeister, USA; and Leo Smith (1881–1952), Canada.

Notes

Works cited

Gallery

External links

A comparison of extant copies of Introduction (Songs of Experience): from the William Blake Archive.
 Songs of Experience - Introduction at the UGA (University Of Georgia) education site

1794 poems
Songs of Innocence and of Experience